Columnist Walter Winchell had been a mainstay on the early years of ABC television with a simulcast of his 15-minute weekly time radio show until he left ABC in 1955 in a dispute with executives.  The Walter Winchell Show of 1956 was the result of his agreement to return with a half hour, television-only broadcast.

In his five-year absence from ABC, the number of television programs linked directly to radio had dwindled greatly, as the still-newish medium had developed its own actors, and the remaining radio holdovers had learned how to play to the camera.  Winchell would have none of this.  Still wearing his felt "reporter" hat on the air, and punching out bogus "Morse Code" with his telegraph key to punctuate his stories, Winchell came across as a relic of another era.  Even his trademark opening line, "Good evening Mr. and Mrs. North and South America and all the ships at sea ... let's go to press!" seemed obsolete by 1960. NBC's Jack Paar relentlessly mocked Winchell on his own show Tonight, a feud that effectively ended Winchell's career.

The revived Winchell program was a Nielsen ratings disaster and was cancelled after only six broadcasts.  Winchell's only real association with ABC or television after this was his continued narration of The Untouchables until that program was cancelled three years later.

References
Brooks, Tim and Marsh, Earle, The Complete Directory to Prime Time Network and Cable TV Shows

American Broadcasting Company original programming
1952 American television series debuts
1955 American television series endings
1960 American television series debuts
1960 American television series endings
Black-and-white American television shows